Stefano Impallomeni (born 24 October 1967 in Rome) is a retired Italian professional footballer who played as a midfielder.

He represented Italy at the 1987 FIFA World Youth Championship.

References

1967 births
Living people
Italian footballers
Italy youth international footballers
Serie A players
Serie B players
Serie C players
A.S. Roma players
Parma Calcio 1913 players
Delfino Pescara 1936 players
Casertana F.C. players

Association football midfielders